is a railway station in Kita-ku, Hamamatsu,  Shizuoka Prefecture, Japan, operated by the third sector Tenryū Hamanako Railroad.

Lines
Ona Station is served by the Tenryū Hamanako Line, and is located 58.1 kilometers from the starting point of the line at Kakegawa Station.

Station layout
The station has a single side platform with a two-story station building. The station is unattended.

Adjacent stations

|-
!colspan=5|Tenryū Hamanako Railroad

Station history
Ona Station was established on December 1, 1936 as a station of the Japan National Railways Futamata Line. Scheduled freight services were discontinued from August 1962. After the privatization of JNR on March 15, 1987, the station came under the control of the Tenryū Hamanako Line.

Passenger statistics
In fiscal 2016, the station was used by an average of 56 passengers daily (boarding passengers only).

Surrounding area
Japan National Route 301

See also
 List of Railway Stations in Japan

References

External links

  Tenryū Hamanako Railroad Station information 
 

Railway stations in Shizuoka Prefecture
Railway stations in Japan opened in 1936
Stations of Tenryū Hamanako Railroad
Railway stations in Hamamatsu